The striped clingfish (Trachelochismus melobesia) is a clingfish of the family  Gobiesocidae, found all around New Zealand from low water to about 5 m, on rocky coastlines.  Its length is between 5 and 10 cm.

References
 
 Tony Ayling & Geoffrey Cox, Collins Guide to the Sea Fishes of New Zealand,  (William Collins Publishers Ltd, Auckland, New Zealand 1982) 

striped clingfish
striped clingfish